Álex Somoza (born 7 July 1986) is an Andorran international footballer who plays club football for FC Andorra, as a midfielder. Today is coach of Inter Club d'Escaldes.

Career
Somoza has played club football for  FC Santa Coloma, CE Principat, FC Rànger's, CD Binéfar and FC Andorra.

He made his international debut for Andorra in 2006, and has appeared in FIFA World Cup qualifying matches for them.

References 

Andorran footballers
1986 births
FC Andorra players
Living people
Andorra international footballers
FC Rànger's players
FC Santa Coloma players
Association football midfielders
CE Principat players
CD Binéfar players